The Banking Act 2009 (c 1) is an Act of the Parliament of the United Kingdom that entered into force in part on the 21 February 2009 in order, amongst other things, to replace the Banking (Special Provisions) Act 2008. The Act makes provision for the nationalisation of banks, amends the law on bank insolvency and administration, and makes provision about the Financial Services Compensation Scheme. It also makes provision about the regulation of inter-bank payment schemes (e.g. BACS), amends the law on the issue of banknotes by Scottish and Northern Irish banks, and makes other miscellaneous amendments to the law on banking.

Banknotes
Part 6 of the Act specifically deals with the right of certain commercial banks in Scotland and Northern Ireland to issue their own private banknotes, repealing the Bank Notes (Scotland) Act 1845, the Bankers (Ireland) Act 1845 and the Bankers (Northern Ireland) Act 1928. The 2009 Act empowers HM Treasury to control banknote issue more strictly, requiring commercial note-issuing bank to maintain backing assets so that, in the event of the commercial failure of a bank, the value of their banknotes would be protected.

The Act additionally prohibits the issue of banknotes by any other banks other than those authorised under the 1845/1928 legislation and the Bank of England, and provides that, if a commercial bank decides to discontinue the issuing its own banknotes, it then irrevocably loses its note-issuing privileges.

See also

2008 United Kingdom bank rescue package
2009 United Kingdom bank rescue package
Bank Charter Act 1844
Banknotes of the pound sterling

References

External links
The Banking Act 2009, as amended from the National Archives.
The Banking Act 2009, as originally enacted from the National Archives.
Explanatory notes to the Banking Act 2009.

United Kingdom Acts of Parliament 2009
2009 in economics
Great Recession in the United Kingdom
Financial regulation in the United Kingdom
Banking legislation in the United Kingdom